Nathan Blecharczyk (born 1983) is an American billionaire businessman. He is the co-founder and chief strategy officer of Airbnb, and chairman of Airbnb China. Blecharczyk was also the company's first chief technology officer. He had an estimated net worth of US$9.3 billion in July 2021.

Early life and education
Blecharczyk was born in 1983, the son of Sheila (née Underwood) and Paul Steven Blecharczyk, who is Polish-American. He grew up in an upper-middle-class family in Boston, Massachusetts. He attended Boston Latin Academy. During high school, he made money by creating his own software business. His web-hosting business provided services to spammers and was once listed on the Spamhaus's "Registry of Known Spam Operators (ROKSO)" which lists the top spamming services. He continued writing programs while attending Harvard University in pursuit of a Bachelor of Science degree in computer science, and made enough money to pay his tuition before abandoning his web-hosting business to focus on his studies in 2002. He was also on the business staff of The Harvard Crimson during his time at Harvard.

Career
Blecharczyk began his career as an engineer at OPNET Technologies in 2005. He served as a lead developer at Batiq in 2007. In 2008, Blecharczyk partnered with Brian Chesky and Joe Gebbia to found Airbnb, he served as the company's first chief technology officer and coded the company's original website using Ruby on Rails. Later that year, after failing to raise funding, the founders bought mass quantities of cereal, designed packaging branded as '"Obama O's" and "Cap'n McCain's" cereal to sell at the Democratic National Convention in Denver, Colorado. Originally intended as a marketing ploy, the company sold enough cereal to raise $30,000, and eventually attracted the attention of Y combinator co-founder Paul Graham who gave them $20,000 in early 2009 and accepted the company into the Y Combinator's seed funding program.

Blecharczyk oversaw Airbnb's 2015 expansion into Cuba. On June 1, 2016, Blecharczyk, Chesky and Gebbia joined Warren Buffett and Bill Gates' 'The Giving Pledge', a select group of billionaires who have committed to give the majority of their wealth away.

In early 2017, Blecharczyk transitioned to chief strategy officer at Airbnb. Blecharczyk was announced as the chairman of Airbnb China, also known as Aibiying, in October 2017.

In summer 2019, Sean Joyce, then a senior Airbnb official, raised concerns after Chinese government officials asked Airbnb for enhanced data sharing in China. The Wall Street Journal reported Blecharczyk responding that the company was not there to "promote American values."

According to Forbes, he had an estimated net worth of US$9.3 billion in July 2021.

Personal life
Blecharczyk resides in San Francisco, California. He is married to Elizabeth Morey Blecharczyk, a neonatologist. They have two children.

References

Living people
People from San Francisco
Harvard University alumni
American billionaires
Real estate company founders
Giving Pledgers
21st-century philanthropists
American chief technology officers
1983 births
American people of Polish descent
Boston Latin Academy alumni